The Milograd culture (also spelled Mylohrad, also known as Pidhirtsi culture on Ukrainian territory) is an archaeological culture, lasting from about the 7th century BC to the 1st century AD. Geographically, it corresponds to present day southern Belarus and northern Ukraine, in the area of the confluence of the Dnieper and the Pripyat, north of Kyiv. Their ethnic origin is uncertain, but likely to be either Baltic or Early Slavic.

The town of Milograd, after which the culture is named, is located in the Homiel Province of the Belarus republic.

See also 

 Middle Dnieper culture
 Pomeranian culture
 Zarubintsy culture
 Przeworsk culture (Middle and Upper Vistula with Rightbank Oder)
 Chernoles culture (Pripyat' basin, Middle Dnieper and part of Upper Dnieper)

References

External links 
 Scythians/Sacae by Jona Lendering

Archaeological cultures of Eastern Europe
Iron Age cultures of Europe
Baltic archaeological cultures
Slavic archaeological cultures
Archaeological cultures in Belarus
Archaeological cultures in Ukraine